The 2017 Canadian Mixed Curling Championship was held from November 13 to 19, 2016 at the Mariners Centre in Yarmouth, Nova Scotia. The winners of this championship represented Canada at the 2017 World Mixed Curling Championship.

Northern Ontario won the championship, the fourth national mixed title for the region.

Teams
The teams are listed as follows:

Round robin

Standings

Scores

Draw 1
Sunday November 13, 7:00pm

Draw 2
Monday November 14, 2:30pm

Draw 3
Monday November 14, 7:00pm

Draw 4
Tuesday November 15, 10:00am

Draw 5
Monday November 15, 2:30pm

Draw 6
Tuesday November 15, 7:00pm

Draw 7
Wednesday November 16, 10:00am

Draw 8
Wednesday November 16, 2:30pm

Draw 9
Wednesday November 16, 7:00pm

Placement Round

Standings

Scores

Draw 10
Thursday November 17, 10:00am

Draw 11
Thursday November 17, 2:30pm

Draw 12
Thursday November 17, 7:00pm

Draw 13
Friday November 18, 10:00am

Draw 14
Friday November 18, 2:30pm

Draw 15
Friday November 18, 7:00pm

Playoffs

Semifinals
Saturday, November 19, 10:00 am

Bronze medal game
Saturday, November 19, 2:30 pm

Final
Saturday, November 19, 2:30 pm

References

External links

2016 in Canadian curling
Canadian Mixed Curling Championship
Curling in Nova Scotia
Yarmouth, Nova Scotia
Canadian Mixed Curling Championship
Canadian Mixed Curling